Impatiens walleriana (syn. Impatiens sultanii), also known as busy Lizzie (British Isles), balsam, sultana, or simply impatiens, is a species of the genus Impatiens, native to eastern Africa from Kenya to Mozambique. The Latin specific epithet walleriana honours a British missionary, Horace Waller (1833–1896).

Description
Leaves are mostly alternate, although they may be opposite near the top of the plant. The changeable, simple leaves are stalked 1.5 to 6 cm long. The leaf blade is ovate to broadly elliptic, sometimes obovate, 2.5 to 13 inches long and 2 to 5.5 inches wide, green and sometimes spotted or pink or reddish on the underside. Leaflets are missing.

The hermaphroditic, zygomorphic flowers are profusely borne, 2–5 cm diameter, with five petals and a 1 cm spur. The seedpod explodes when ripe in the same manner as other Impatiens species, an evolutionary adaptation for seed dispersal. The lower sepals are slightly boat-shaped and narrow suddenly in the 2.8 to 4.5 inches long, thread-like curved, but not curved back spur. The stems are semi-succulent, and all parts of the plant (leaves, stems, flowers, roots) are soft and easily damaged.

Cultivation

Although perennial in frost-free growing conditions, it is usually treated as a half-hardy annual in temperate regions (though pot-grown plants can be successfully overwintered indoors). It is one of the most popular of all bedding plants for parks and gardens worldwide, typically grown in containers but also in bedding schemes. Propagation is by seed or stem cuttings (which often root readily in water).

Cultivars
Numerous cultivars in a range of colours from white to purple, are widely available commercially, either as seeds or young plants. They include the following:

Accent series
'Blackberry Ice'
'Confection'
'Eclipse'
'Elfin White'
'Extra Dwarf'
'Fiesta Ole' (double variety)
'Lipstick'
'Red Star'
Super Elfin series
Tempo Series
'Wink and Blink'

Super Elfin series was bred by Claude Hope in Costa Rica. Hope developed this species from its native wild form into one of the most popular bedding plants in the world.

AGM cultivars
The following cultivars have gained the Royal Horticultural Society’s Award of Garden Merit:- 
 
Divine Series
 
Magnum Series
 
SunHarmony Series
 = 'Dhar328'  
SunPatiens Series
  = 'Sakimp013' 
  = 'Sakimp025' 
  = ‘Sakimp011’
  = ‘Sakimp005’ 
  = ‘Sakimp018’

References

Afromontane flora
walleriana
Flora of Kenya
Flora of Malawi
Flora of Mozambique
Flora of Tanzania
Flora of Zimbabwe
Garden plants of Africa